Prodoxus quinquepunctellus is a moth of the family Prodoxidae. It is found from southern Alberta, Canada, to the Mexican Plateau of northern Mexico. The habitat consists of desert, grassland, openings in pine or deciduous forests and coastal chaparral and dunes.

The wingspan is 12–23 mm. The forewings are mostly pure white, but sometimes have one to fourteen small spots. The hindwings range from grey to near white, but are always darker than the forewings.

The larvae feed on a wide range of capsular-fruited Yucca species. They feed inside the inflorescence stalk. Pupation takes place inside the gallery.

References

Moths described in 1875
Prodoxidae